Thomas Sullivan is the author of some eighty short stories and novels.

His work involves characters in intensely psychological situations that range from thrillers (The Water Wolf) to comedy (The Phases of Harry Moon).  Awards and recognitions are for literary and genre fiction. He has lived in Lathrup Village, Michigan.

His 1988 novel The Phases of Harry Moon received a Pulitzer Prize nomination.

Selected novels
 Diapason (1978)
 The Phases of Harry Moon (1988)
 Born Burning (1989)
 The Martyring (1998)
 Dust of Eden (2004)
 Second Soul (2005)
 The Water Wolf (2006)
 Case White (2017)

Awards, honors and prizes

Nominations include
Nebula Award nomination for The Fence, 1987.
A finalist for the 1999 World Fantasy Award for Best Novel for The Martyring.

Listed in
He is listed in:
Who's Who of International Authors and Writers
Men of Distinction
Contemporary Authors
Men of Achievement
Dictionary of International Biography
Michigan Authors

References

External links 
 Thomas Sullivan's website
 Thomas Sullivan's Nomination to the1000best
 
 "AUTHOR THOMAS SULLIVAN - 5 QUESTIONS YOU DIDN'T EXPECT - A Deep Blue Interview", March 30, 2006

Year of birth missing (living people)
American fantasy writers
American horror writers
American male novelists
American male short story writers
American science fiction writers
American short story writers
Living people
Novelists from Michigan
People from Oakland County, Michigan